was a railway station located in Shimizu (清水), Bifuka, Nakagawa District (Teshio), Hokkaidō, and is operated by the Hokkaido Railway Company. The station was closed and was turned into a signal station.

Lines serviced
Hokkaido Railway Company
Sōya Main Line

Adjacent stations

External links
Ekikara Time Table - JR Toyoshimizu Station

Railway stations in Hokkaido Prefecture
Railway stations in Japan opened in 1950